Guangdong University of Foreign Studies (GDUFS) is a public university with emphasis in foreign languages and cultures, overseas economy and trade, and international strategies in Guangzhou, Guangdong, China. The university offers 61 bachelor-degree specialties and teaches 18 foreign languages. In 2014, it boasted 20,189 undergraduate students and 2818 postgraduate and doctoral students, and over 12,000 students of continuing education and overseas students. The school has a state-level key discipline and seven province-level key disciplines. 

The state-level key discipline of Foreign Language and Literature is given priority in the third-phase development of Guangdong province's  Project 211 (the provincial government's plan to build up 11  key universities, which is an extended version of the Chinese government's Project 211– in the 21st century, the government is to build up 100 top universities and 100 key disciplines). The school has established ties with international organizations and academic agencies. 

As South China's first university that signed a cooperation memorandum with the United Nations, it is one of the world's 21 universities qualified to train and supply language professionals for the organization. It is also the only university of foreign languages in China that is included in Campus Asia.

History of the University

In March 1964, the Central South Bureau of the Central Government, and the Party Committee and the People's Government of Guangdong Province decided to set up a foreign languages institute to train  competent graduates to meet the demands of the increasing international exchanges. In November 1964, with the sanction of the Central Government, Guangzhou Foreign Languages Institute was established. In July 1965, it began to enroll 4-year bachelor's degree students and offered 4 specialties – English, German, French, and Spanish. It was located at the old site of Guangdong Petroleum School in the Northeast suburbs of Guangzhou.

Since January 1966, Guangzhou Foreign Languages Institute had been operating under the jurisdiction of the Ministry of Higher Education of the Central People's Government. In October 1969, in accordance with the CPC Central Committee's Notice to Transfer the Institutions of Higher Education to the Revolutionary Committees, the institute was delegated to Guangdong Province's Cultural Revolutionary Committee.

In October 1970, Guangdong Provincial Revolutionary Committee restructured the institutions of higher education in Guangdong Province. As a result, Sun Yat-sen University Foreign Languages Department, Jinan University Foreign Languages and Foreign Trade Department, and Guanghzou Foreign Languages School were merged into Guangzhou Foreign Languages Institute. In the meantime, the institute was renamed as Guangdong Foreign Languages Institute and was then moved to the old site of Central South Forestry Institute in the Northern Suburbs of Guangzhou.

In November 1977, the school resumed the name of Guangzhou Foreign Languages Institute and again operated directly under the jurisdiction of the Ministry of Education.

In December 1980, with the approval of the State Council, Guangzhou Foreign Trade Institute was established in the northern suburbs of Guangzhou. The institute evolved from Guangdong Provincial Foreign Trade Cadres School, which was founded in 1957 and operated directly under the jurisdiction of Guangdong Provincial Foreign Trade Bureau. In 1960, on the basis of Guangdong Provincial Foreign Trade Cadres School, Guangdong Foreign Trade School was founded and began to matriculate excellent students from middle schools, who were required to fulfill five years studies. In 1961, Guangdong Provincial Foreign Trade School became attached to Guangdong Provincial Finance and Trade Cadres School. During the Cultural Revolution (1966-1976), Guangdong Provincial Foreign Trade School was suspended for a time and re-opened in 1973. In accordance with the decision by Guangdong provincial government, Guangzhou Foreign Languages Institute Foreign Trade Department was incorporated into Guangdong Provincial Foreign Trade School, which began to enroll three-year college students in 1978. Later, the newly founded Guangzhou Foreign Trade Institute offered foreign trade economy, foreign trade accounting, and other specialties, and the students enrolled were required to fulfill four years schooling. The institute operated under the joint jurisdiction of the Ministry of Foreign Trade and Guangdong provincial government, with the former playing the dominant role.

In September 1994, Guangzhou Foreign Trade Institute was delegated to the jurisdiction of the People's Government of Guangdong Province by the Ministry of Foreign Trade and Economic Cooperation. In January 1995, Guangzhou Foreign Languages Institute was transferred to Guangdong province by the State Education Commission. In May 1995, the two institutes merged. As a result, Guangdong University of Foreign Studies came into being.

In 2003, with the approval of the People's Government of Guangdong Province, Guangdong University of Foreign Studies joined the University Town program and officially started the construction of South Campus. In September 2004, the campus came into use and received its first batch of university students.

In October 2008, according to the decision by the People's Government of Guangdong Province, Guangdong Vocational College of Finance and Economics, which was established in April 1996, had been named Guangdong College of Finance and Tax Administration from April 1996 to July 2001 and was incorporated into Guangdong University of Foreign Studies.

The University’s Environment and Campuses
The university, which consists of three campuses,  covers an area of 2292 mu. The north campus, located at the foot of the Baiyun Mountains, covers an area of 939 mu. The south campus, situated in the Guangzhou Higher Education Mega Center, covers an area of 1095 mu. And the Dalang campus, located in Dalang, covers an area of 258 mu.

The North Campus is in Baiyun District and the South Campus is in Panyu District.

The Structure of the University

Faculties 

Altogether, there are 19 schools of bachelor-degree education: Faculty of English Language and Culture, Faculty of Economics and Trade, Faculty of International Business English, Faculty of Finance, Faculty of Commerce, Faculty of Accountancy, Faculty of Western Languages and Cultures, Faculty of Eastern Languages and Cultures, Faculty of Chinese Language and Culture, School of Legal Studies, Faculty of English Education, School of Cisco Informatics, School of Political Science and Public Administration, School of Marxism, School of Interpreting and Translation Studies, School of Journalism and Communication, College of Art, Physical Education Department, and Center for Experimental Education.

Research Centers
The university has formed a comprehensive system consisting of nation-level, province-level, city-level, and school-level research bases. It has one key research base of humanities and social sciences under the auspices of the Ministry of Education — Center for the Research of Linguistics and Applied Linguistics; one research base of the contrastive studies of the other countries and regions with China under the auspices of the Ministry of Education — Center for Canadian Studies; four key research bases   of humanities and social sciences under the auspices of Guangdong Department of Education—Center for the Research of Foreign Literature and Culture, Center for the Research of International Economics and Trade, Center for Translation Studies, Center for the Research of Cantonese Merchants; one key research base of soft science under the auspices of Guangdong province's Department of Education; one important base for the research and assessment of local legislature and consultation service under the auspices of Guangdong Department of Education; one key research base of humanities and social sciences under the auspices of Guangzhou Bureau of Education — Center for the Research of Guangzhou as an International Business Hub; one key laboratory of philosophy and social sciences under the auspices of Guangdong Department of Education — Center for the Research of Language Engineering and Computation; one strategic think-tank under the auspices of Guangdong Department of Education — Guangdong Research Institute for International Strategies.

In 2000, the Center for the Research of Linguistics and Applied Linguistics, whose predecessor was Research Institute of Foreign Linguistics and Applied Linguistics, was selected as the key research base of humanities and social sciences by the Ministry of Education.  The Center is dedicated to the research of second language acquisition, social and public discourses, and language ontology. Guangdong Institute for the Research of International Strategies, which was approved by the People's Government of Guangdong province in 2009, is a think-tank dedicated to the research on Guangdong's international strategies, particularly on China's participation in the governance of global economy, Guangdong's going global, the Maritime Silk Road, and the like.

In addition, the university has formed two province-level research centers— Center for Collaborative Innovation of Foreign Language Research and Services, and Center for Collaborative Innovation of Guangdong Going Global Strategies. The school has completed a host of state-level key research projects and team innovation projects under the auspices of the National Social Sciences Fund and the Ministry of Education, and won quite a few high-level awards for the scholars’ relevant outstanding academic achievements. Also, the school publishes Modern Foreign Languages (core journal), International Economics and Trade Research (core journal), Journal of Guangdong University of Foreign Studies, Journal of Strategy and Decision Making, and the like. Besides, it has set up more than 10 university-level research institutes, such as Research Institute of International Service Outsourcing.

Library

Printed resources 
By the statistical figures given in August 2014, the library boasts 2,894,000 copies of books in 20 languages in total. To be specific, there are 501,000 kinds and 20,840,000 copies of Chinese books; 130,000 kinds and 496,000 copies of English originals; 71,000 kinds and 179,000 copies of non-English originals; 1659 kinds and 2167 copies of Chinese and foreign journals; 135,000 copies of bound volume of back numbers. The library enjoys an abundance of foreign books and journals, which make the library, stand out from the other libraries across the universities.

Electronic resources 
The library boasts 1,780,000 kinds (copies) of Chinese and foreign electronic books, including 1,700,000 kinds of Chinese books and 80,000 kinds of foreign books. It has subscribed 85 kinds of electronic database, including 42 kinds of Chinese database and 43 kinds of foreign database. Besides, it provides 18 kinds of network database that can be openly accessed and 20 kinds of database specially created for certain disciplines and specialties. It has 5769 kinds of electronic Chinese journals and 40,750 kinds of electronic foreign journals and 67,000 kinds of electronic books. The databases created by the university include: Center for the Research of Guangdong's Literature Resources, Chaoxing Electronic Books Service, Linguistics and Applied Linguistics Research Database, Foreign Literature and Cultural Research Database, GDUFS Academic Archiving System Database, Liang Zongdai's Works and Relevant Research Database.

Special collections 
The Center for Research of Foreign Linguistics and Applied Linguistics houses books and journals that cannot be taken out of the reading room.

The Liang Zongdai Library houses all the books that the renowned poet-cum-scholar-cum-translator collected, his monographs, and his relevant research materials, including the books autographed by the French writers Ambroise-Paul-Toussaint-Jules Valéry and Romain Rolland.

The Center for Research of Business English collects and displays the English classics of economy, business, and management, the latest relevant works, the related core journals, and the relevant database.

The Center for Research of Guangdong's Literature Resources is the result of the cooperation of Guangdong University of Foreign Studies with Southern Publishing & Media Co. Ltd. It collects literature resources related to Guangdong's politics, economy, culture, society, and relevant electronic resources.

The Room for the Teachers' Works collects almost 2,000 representative works written by the teachers of the university.

The Room for Prized Works houses classics such as Siku Quanshu (Complete Library in the Four Branches of Literature), compiled in 1772-1782 at the order of the Qianlong Emperor, and voluminous English dictionaries.

The Digital Library contains a world of electronic books, electronic journals, audiovisual and picture resources, conference papers, theses, dissertations, statistical data, and test questions databases. It provides a host of databases: such as CNKI, Du Xiu Knowledge Bank, Chao Xing Renowned Professors’ Rostrum, China Economic Statistics Database, the State Council's Information Network of Development Research Center, China Law Resources Database, MyiLibrary, Taylor & Francis SSH, Web of Knowledge SSCI, CUP (Cambridge University Press), OUP (Oxford University Press), Wiley-Blackwell, Elsevier ScienceDirect, EBSCO, Proquest, HeinOnline, ACM (Association for Computing Machinery), PressDisplay (multi-language newspapers databank).

Laboratories
The floor space of the laboratories totals more than 55,000 square meters. In recent years, the investment in the facilities has been on the increase. In 2013-2014, the money that went to upgrade the laboratories amounted to 10,188,600 yuan; 726 articles of instruments were purchased. Now the university boasts 122 teaching laboratories, including eight provincial-level teaching demonstration centers— Digital Language Teaching Demonstration Center, Digital Simultaneous Interpreting Experimental Center, Broadband Multimedia Experimental Center, International Economy and Management Demonstration Center, Legal Studies Experimental Teaching Center, Digital Media & Art Teaching Demonstration Center, Computer Network Technology Teaching Center, and Computer Experimental Teaching Center.

Teaching Staff 
By the statistical figure given in December 2018, the university has 1320 full-time teachers. According to the data in October 2014, there are 240 full professors, 358 associate professors, 48 PhD supervisors, 338 MA/MS supervisors, 10 teachers entitled to a special government allowance granted by the State Council, 3 teachers chosen as the leading figure in their disciplines in the national ambitious talent training program (by 2010, the country hopes to turn out several hundred outstanding scientists, engineers and theorists that can shine in the world of science and technology, several thousand pace-setters in their disciplines and technological fields in the country, and several ten thousand young scholars of great potentials that can lead their disciplines), 1 middle-aged teacher cited for his outstanding contribution, 13 teachers chosen as candidates for the elite talents supported by the Ministry of Education, 2 state-level teaching teams, 7 province-level teaching teams, and 1 state-level renowned teacher, 4 teachers included in the province-level Pearl River Scholars Program, 1 teacher chosen as a candidate for the national ambitious talent training program, 44 teachers chosen as candidates for Guangdong's ambitious talent training program(1n 1996, the Department of Education initiated a project to train 10 scholars that can exert influence on the domestic and overseas academic world, 100 original academic pace-setters in their respective disciplines, and 1000 leading scholars of potentials), 7 chosen as candidates for Guangdong Outstanding Young Teachers Program, 14 teachers having received financial support from Guangdong Talents Program, 11 teachers having won financial support from Guangdong Special Fund for Bringing in Talents, 42 teachers included in the university-level Yunshan Scholars Program.

Since the start of the 12th Five-Year Plan (2011), the university has won 7 state-level key research programs in humanities and social sciences, ranking the 4th after Sun Yatsen University, Jinan University, and South China Normal University. Besides, it has captured more than 500 research programs financed by governments at different levels, including 7 state-level major programs, 4 state-level key programs, and about 80 other state-level programs, with the research fund totaling more than 30,000,000 yuan. In addition, the teachers have published more than 200 monographs and 3000 academic papers, 200 of which are included in the leading Chinese and overseas journals, and secured more than 30 awards at the province- and the ministry- level.

The University's Renowned Scholars

Liang Zongdai, Wen Qichang, Wang Zongyan, Ren Liren, Wang Duo’en, Ruan Jingqing, Li Weici, Wu Xu, Lu Zhenxuan, Gui Cankun, Weng Xianliang, Gu Shouchang, Zeng Zhaoke, Cai Wenxian, Dai Liuling, Gui Shichun, Li Xiaoju, Qian Guanlian, and the like.

The University's Foreign Teachers

In 2014, the school employed more than 220 long-term and short-term foreign teachers.

The Development of Disciplines

An Outline of the Disciplines and Foreign Languages 

By August 2014, the school had offered 61 bachelor-degree specialties (In 2014 Polish and Digital Media were added in.), which fell into eight disciplines: literature, economics, management, law, engineering, science, education, and art. The 61 specialties include: English, economics, statistics, public finance, tax revenue, international economics and trade, finance, insurance, mathematics and applied mathematics (financial mathematics and actuarial science), business English, international commerce, industrial and commercial management, marketing studies, human resources management, logistics, accounting studies, auditing studies, financial management, French science, German science, Russian science, Spanish science, Italian science, Portuguese science, Polish science, Japanese science, Indonesian science, Thai science, Vietnamese science, Korean science, Arabian science, Hindi science, Burmese science, Laos science, Chinese Science, teaching Chinese to speakers of other languages, Chinese language and literature, legal studies, diplomatic science, international political science, pedagogy, computer science and technology, software engineering, network engineering, management of information system, electronic commerce, public service administration, administration management, applied psychology, social work, translation and interpreting studies, journalism, advertising studies, broadcasting and hosting studies, music performance, visual communication design, digital media art, music studies, and
dance performance.

The school teaches 18 foreign languages—English, French, German, Russian, Spanish, Italian, Portuguese, Polish, Japanese, Indonesian, Thai, Vietnamese, Korean, Arabic, Hindi, Burmese, Laos, Cambodian, and the like.

PhD and Master Programs 

The school has 1 first-category discipline PhD program (foreign languages and literature), 11 second-category PhD program (foreign linguistics and applied linguistics, French language and literature, English language and culture, Japanese language and culture, interpreting and translation studies, contrastive cultural studies, Russian language and literature, German language and culture, European studies, foreign languages teaching technology and assessment, and Business English studies), 10 first-category master programs (foreign languages and cultures, theoretical economics, applied economics, legal studies, political science, Chinese language and literature, management science and engineering, business administration, statistics, and Marxist theory), 36 second-category Master programs (Foreign linguistics and applied linguistics, English language and literature, interpreting and translation studies, French language and literature, German language and literature, Russian language and literature, Spanish language and literature, Japanese language and culture, Asian-African language and literature, international trade, world economics, regional economics, enterprise management, accounting studies, international legal studies, civil and commercial law studies, international relations, arts and literature studies, comparative literature and world literature, ideological and political education studies, European studies, business English studies, contrastive cultural studies, foreign languages teaching technology and assessment, history of economy, financial studies, industrial economics, public finance studies, constitution and administrative law studies, theories of political science, Chinese classics, technical economy and management, social management, China-style Marxism, Cultural communication and media, English education), and 7 professional degree Master programs (business administration, translation and interpreting, law, teaching Chinese to speakers of other languages, international business, accounting, journalism and communication).

Development of the Leading Disciplines 

The State-level Key Disciplines: Guangdong University of Foreign Studies initiated Foreign Linguistics and Applied Linguistics. The main pioneers are Gui Shichun, Li Xiaoju, He Ziran, Qian Guanlian, and other professors. Since 1988, it has been chosen through public appraisal as the state-level key discipline.

The Province-level Key Disciplines: In 2012, Foreign Language and Literature and six other disciplines were chosen as Guangdong province's key disciplines, including 1 top discipline (Foreign Languages and Literature), 3 superior disciplines (Applied Economics, Business Administration, and Legal Studies), and 3 special disciplines (Comparative Literature and World Literature, International Relations, and Political Theories)

The Disciplines Given Priority to Develop in the Third Phase of Guangdong Provincial 211 Project: The first-category discipline Foreign Language and Literature and the secondary-category discipline Comparative Literature and World Literature were given priority to develop in the third phase of Guangdong Provincial 211 Project. In 2009, as a continuation of the research of foreign language and literature in the context of globalization, The Development of Center for Liberal Arts (Ren Wen Xue) ----On the Transformation of the Soul in Literature from the Comparative Cultural Perspective was authorized by the Department of Education and integrated into the third phase of Guangdong Provincial 211 Project. In 2012, the two research projects above were both checked and accepted by the experts commissioned by the Department of Education.

2011 Program (A program aims at upgrading the capability of innovation on the part of university students):  The university set up    Center for Collaborative Innovation of Foreign
Language Research and Services, which was the only culture-and-society-related center of this kind in Guangdong province (there are 11 collaborative innovation centers altogether, including 4 centers established by the universities directly under the jurisdiction of the Ministry of Education.) This center has been listed by the Department of Education of Guangdong Province as a candidate for National 2011 Collaborative Innovation Program.

The university also set up Center for Collaborative Innovation of Guangdong Going Global Strategies, which was rated as a candidate for a collaborative innovation center for Guangdong's Regional Development.

The university also set up a base of training translators and interpreters of multiple languages, which was regarded as one of the first batch of its kind in Guangdong province.

Enrollment and Internship 

The school enrolls students from more than 20 provinces, autonomous
regions, and municipalities directly under the Central Government, Hong Kong, and Macao. Students are admitted into the school either by taking the special
exam given to the top 20% of the students at model senior high schools or by
sitting in for the national college entrance exam. Students of Xinjiang Uygur Autonomous
Region are chosen either from the preparatory school or from the special class
of senior high schools in inland provinces. And students of Hong Kong, Macao,
and Taiwan are either exempted from the entrance examination or recommended by
their schools.

Today, the school has 2 state-level bases for training purposes (China
Foreign Trade Center (Group) and Guangxi Bureau of International Expositions,
the former for students of economics and the latter for students of language and literature), 16 province-level bases for such purposes (China Import and Export
Fair, China International SME Fair, the People's Procuratorate of Foshan,  Guangzhou Togogo Technology Co. Ltd, China—ASEAN
Exposition, Guangdong Textiles Import & Export Co. Ltd, Ernst & Young, Guangzhou
Huasheng Transport Co. Ltd, Zhongshan Daily Press Group, Guangya High School, HSBC
Software Development (Guangdong) Limited (HSDC)), Shenzhen Intermediate People's Court, Guangdong Capgemini Business Data Processing Service Co. Ltd., Guangdong
Desheng Creative Park, Guangzhou Sunda International Trading Co. Ltd.

Students Employment 

In recent years, the school's graduates were in great demand at the job
market. Some of them were employed by the world's top 500 companies. According
to the statistical figure for 2011-2013, the employment rate for undergraduate
students was 95.44%, 94.25％, and 98.14％ respectively, and the employment rate for postgraduate students was
96.07%, 297.07％, and 99.30％ respectively. (The figures come from Guangdong Province's Center for the Guidance of University Students Employment).

According to the Annual Report on the Market's Demand for GDUFS Graduates
and the Quality of its Education, which was published by MyCOS Data in 2014, the students of 2013's degree of satisfaction with their jobs was 65%, 4% higher
than that of the graduates of the same year from the top universities (which
are financed by the 211 Project); their degree of satisfaction with the Alma
Mater was 97%, 6% higher than that of the graduates of the same year from the
top universities (which are financed by the 211 Project); the percentage of these
students willing to recommend the Alma Mater was as high as 78%, 4% higher than
that of the graduates of the same year from the top universities (which are
financed by the 211 Project); the percentage of these students reluctant to recommend
the Alma Mater was 6%, 6% lower than that of the graduates of the same year
from the top universities (which are financed by the 211 Project); the monthly
income after a half year's work averaged 4728 yuan, 605 yuan higher than that of the graduates of the same year from the top universities (which are financed
by the 211 Project).

Academic Research

Postdoctoral Research Program 

The Postdoctoral Research Program, which was established with the sanction of the Ministry of Personnel and the National Postdoctoral Management Committee in
November 2003, offers Foreign Languages and Literature as its discipline. The
program is attached to Center for Research of Foreign Linguistics and Applied
Linguistics. Now it has 33 postdoctoral supervisors, including 9 professors entitled to special government allowance granted by the State Council. By then end of 2014, 15 scholars have completed their research and 24 scholars are
still working on their projects.

Controversies and Incidents

Punishment for the Gay Teacher Who Publicly Came Out In Support of Qiu Bai 
In August 2015, Qiu Bai, a student at Sun Yat-sen University in Guangdong Province, People's Republic of China, took the Ministry of Education to court for pathologizing and stigmatizing homosexuality in a large number of teaching materials. After the case was filed, she was severely hindered by the school administration - the staff informed her family of her sexual orientation and she was taken to the hospital by her family for examinationiu Bai's ordeal sparked outrage from the LGBT community, but few teachers within the system have publicly expressed support for her. Cui Le, who was a teacher at the Guangdong University of Foreign Studies, came out as a gay teacher and wrote an article in the media in solidarity with Qiu Ba

Soon, various school departments began to investigate him, and staff from the Office of Academic Affairs began to come to Cui's classroom to listen and ask his students about the content he taught in his lessons. Cui then asked the staff of the school about the specific rules he had broken, and the response was, "By way of analogy, people say you have committed a crime, what more do you want with the law?" He was approached by the two vice presidents responsible for  supervising the teaching content: "Homosexuality, a highly sensitive topic that most people do not accept, is never allowed in the classroom, and the university is very adamant about this attitude"; "undergraduates have limited acceptance and cannot 'indoctrinate' students with controversial things". The vice-principal criticized, "You are a teacher of Guangdong University of Foreign Studies, you can't say these things in public"; "It's not easy for our school to have today's reputation, all the teachers at our school have the obligation to maintain its honour. If you talk about homosexuality in class, others will think that our school is in a mess"; "A good bottle of wine, as long as contaminated by a little bit of rat's shit, would not be good anymore".

Cui was asked to write a pledge that he would no longer talk about gay issues in the classroom, that he would no longer have dealings and collaborations with NGOs, and that he would no longer make gender-related comments on the internet and in the media as a teacher at Guangdong University of Foreign Studies. Afterwards, the school publicly released the disciplinary document "Decision on the Sanction for Giving Cui Le Serious Teaching Accident (Grade II)" on the grounds that Cui Le had invited scholars and publicists from outside the school to give four lectures on sex and gender issues in two classes of "Sociolinguistics" and "Chinese Vocabulary" in October and November 2015, and the charges included "not approved by the school", "the content of the lecture is not related to the main syllabus", "causing adverse effects", and disqualified him from being evaluated for merit that year, plus a fine of one-month allowance. In addition, the red-headed document will enter the teacher's personnel file, creating an uncertain risk for his future movement among colleges and universities within the Chinese system. In April 2016, six months after Cui Le was disciplined, the school issued a document titled "Notice on Regulating the Invitation of External Experts to Hold Lectures," but the school had no relevant approval regulations at the time Cui Le held the lectures.

In terms of teaching, the Vice-Principal re-emphasized that "the content of teaching must lead to a positive outlook on life and be in line with the mainstream of China" and that "some Western ideas are not appropriate in China, which has its own characteristics". The Vice-Chancellors also cited the incident Occupy Central in Hong Kong and the "Lessons from the Disintegration of the Soviet Union" as examples to illustrate the complexity of the political environment and to alert them to the "infiltration" of NGOs and to enhance their "political sensitivity". "The infiltration of NGOs is silent"; "Once the traditional ideas are liberalized, they can't be held back"; "You supported Qiu Bai at Sun Yat-sen University, but what do you know about her background? You're young and there are a lot of things you can't see clearly." Cui was asked to continue to strengthen his self-reflection: "What do you think of this disciplinary action by the school? Do you really accept it by heart? From the material you have written, your understanding is not yet in place and is tinged with resistance. The school is not trying to restrict you by doing this, it is for your own good. That's something I hope you have the height of awareness to think about."

On May 17, 2020, the same day as The International Day Against Homophobia, Transphobia and Biphobia, Cui Le released the article "After coming out: a homosexual teacher disciplined", detailing his experience of being investigated, reprimanded, disciplined by the school authorities as a homosexual teacher who came out publicly and taught gender issues in class when teaching at the Guangdong University of Foreign Studies four years ago. The article was subsequently deleted across China's internet inside the Great Fire Wall.

Lesbian students denied diploma 
In 2016, lesbian student Yang Huang proposed to her girlfriend Xiaoyu Wang at the university's graduation ceremony. The university repeatedly told Xiaoyu Wang that she would not receive her diploma because of this incident. Later, LGBT organization ALL OUT initiated a petition letter to demand apology, which collected about 75,000 signatures supporting the lesbian students.

International Cooperation

A Survey of the Cooperation and Exchange 

The school has carried out extensive international cooperation and exchanges with universities across the world. By December 2014, it has formed close ties with 268 universities and academic research institutes from more than 40 countries and regions, such as the United States, Britain, France, Germany, Spain, Italy, Canada, Australia, Japan, Russia, Malaysia, Indonesia, Thailand, Vietnam, Korea, Chile, Cuba, Mexico and Hong Kong, Macao, Taiwan, and the like. In 2014, it received 2562 overseas students from 116 countries and regions. Of all the university graduates each year, 18% of them once studied abroad. The school has carried out collaborative research with Lancaster University, the World Bank, the European Union, and other universities and international research institutes.

Cooperation with France

During several years, the university was the unique provider of foreign students for French university. It was clearly the ambition of French General Consulate in Guangzhou to strengthen cooperation and ties between that university and French ones. The Alliance Française depended in fact a lot from Guanwai. In 2009, the university was not anymore a support for the Alliance Francaise. Thanks to the effort from Mauve Sébastien and Philippe Bourdon, a lot of conferences were clearly emphasized the importance of French expect in different topics: the forum of European study with Prof Bossuat, from Cergy Pontoise University, and Mr Poisson from the University of Montpellier.

A Survey of the Confucius Institutes 
The school has opened three Confucius Institutes abroad: Sapporo University Confucius Institute, Ural Federal University Confucius Institute, Catholic University of Santa María Confucius Institute.

Renowned Alumni 
Wen Yaoshen, who entered the school in 1965, served as mayor of the People's
Government of Yufun City, chief of the Party Committee of Yunfu City, and chairman of the Committee for the Protection of Environment and Resources of the People's Congress of Guangdong province.

Yu Ping, who entered the school in
1970, serves as vice chairman of China Council for the Promotion of International Trade.

Wang Hua, who entered the school in 1970, serves as ambassador
plenipotentiary and extraordinary to the Republic of Guinea-Bissau.

Liang Shugen, who entered the school in 1970, serves as consul general to Consulate-General of the People's Republic of China in Cape Town. He once served as consul general to Consulate-General of the People's Republic of China in Melbourne and Vancouver.

Xu Zhenhua, who was admitted into the school in 1970, served as president
and chief of the Party Committee of Guangdong University of Foreign Studies. As PhD supervisor in French language and literature, he served on the Ministry of
Education's Committee for the Guidance of Teaching Foreign Language as a Specialty.
Also, he served as deputy president of Chinese Society of French Literature
Studies. Besides, he is a member of the standing committee of the 10th
political consultative conference of Guangdong Province, and deputy chief of
Hong Kong, Macao, and Taiwan Affairs Committee. In addition, he won the honor
of Chevalier de l’Ordre des Palmes Académiques.

Sui Hui, who entered the school in 1972, serves as executive secretary of the UN Industrial Development
Organization. She served as economic and commercial counselor of the Embassy of
the People's Republic of China in Greece and director of the Department of Foreign Affairs of the Ministry of Commerce.

Qiu Juliang, who was admitted into the school in 1972, serves as first
secretary to Science and Technology Division of China's Embassy in France. He once won Legion of Honor and served as deputy director of Bureau of
International Cooperation of the Chinese Academy of Sciences.

Wang Yanlan, who was admitted into the school in 1973, served as director
and president of China Guardian Auctions Co., Ltd. She was one of the founders
of the company.

Lin Difu, who was admitted into the school in 1974, serves as inspector of
Hong Kong and Macao Affairs Office of Guangdong Province. He once served as ambassador plenipotentiary to the Republic of Botswana.

Liao Juhua, who was admitted into the school in 1974, serves as
consul-general to Consulate-General of China in Milan. She once served as consul-general to Consulate-General of China in Auckland.

Qiu Shaofeng, who was admitted into the school in 1974, served as
ambassador plenipotentiary and extraordinary to The Republic of Sierra Leone and consul-general to Consulate-General of China in Sydney and Los Angeles.

He Tongxin, who was admitted into the school in 1974, serves as chairman of
the board of directors and chief of the Party Committee of China General
Technology (Group) Holding Co., Ltd. He once served as deputy governor of the
People's Government of Hunan Province.

Huang Hua, who was admitted into the school in 1975, serves as president of
China South International Co. Ltd.

Wang Chao, who was admitted into the school in 1977, serves as deputy
minister of the Ministry of Foreign Affairs. He once served as deputy minister of the Ministry of Commerce.

Wang Yaohui, who was admitted into the school in 1977, serves as president
of WRSA Chamber of Commerce-WRSACC and director of Center for China and Globalization.

Fang Jianzhuang, who was admitted into the school in 1977, serves as chief of the Party Committee of Guangdong Polytechnic Institute and The Open University of Guangdong. He once served
as president of Guangdong Teachers College of Foreign Language and Arts, and
Guangzhou Open University.

Zheng Lihua, who was admitted into the school in 1977, is a full professor
and PhD supervisor in French language and literature. He once won the honor of Chevalier
de l’Ordre des Palmes Académiques.

Zhou Haizhong, who was admitted into the school in 1979, is a
mathematician, a linguist, and a full professor of Sun Yat-sen University.

Xiong Shaohui, who was admitted into the school in 1984, serves as Guangdong
Zhenrong Energy Co.Ltd. He once won the honor of Model Worker of Guangdong Province.

Li Shaoshan, who was admitted into the school as a PhD candidate in 1987, serves as dean of PLA University of Foreign Studies in Luoyang.

Zeng Yongqiang, who was admitted into the school as a MA candidate in 1988,
serves as director of Guangdong Teachers College of Foreign Language and Arts.

Zeng Dexiang, who was admitted into the school in 1989, serves as chairman
of the board of directors of Guangzhou BOSMA Technology Co. Ltd.

Wen Qi, who was admitted into the school in 1994, serves as chairman of the
board of directors of Kingsun Optoelectronic Co. Ltd in Dongguan

 Xue Yiwei, Chinese writer resident in Montreal, Canada

References 

Universities and colleges in Guangzhou
Translation and interpreting schools
Language education in China
Guangzhou Higher Education Mega Center
Educational institutions established in 1995
1965 establishments in China